Paul Lemmens (born 29 June 1954) is a Belgian judge born in Wilrijk, Belgium and currently the judge of the European Court of Human Rights in respect of Belgium.

References

1954 births
Living people
20th-century Belgian judges
Judges of the European Court of Human Rights
Belgian judges of international courts and tribunals
People from Wilrijk
21st-century Belgian judges